Herzberg is a German surname originating in Germany meaning "heart mountain". Notable people with the surname include:

Agnes M. Herzberg, Canadian statistician
Frederick Herzberg (1923–2000), American psychologist
Elaine Herzberg, killed as a pedestrian via an autonomous car
Gary Allan Herzberg, American country singer who goes by stage name Gary Allan
Gerhard Herzberg (1904–1999), German-Canadian physicist and physical chemist

German-language surnames